
Year 1566 (MDLXVI) was a common year starting on Tuesday (link will display the full calendar) of the Julian calendar.

Events 

 January–June 
 January 7 – Pope Pius V succeeds Pope Pius IV, as the 225th pope.
 February 24 – In one of the first gun assassinations in Japanese (if not world) history, Mimura Iechika is shot dead by two brothers (Endo Matajiro and Yoshijiro), sent by his rival Ukita Naoie.
 March 28 – The foundation stone of Valletta, which will become Malta's capital city, is laid by Jean Parisot de Valette, Grand Master of the Sovereign Military Order of Malta.
 April 5 – The Compromise of Nobles is presented to Margaret of Parma, Governor of the Habsburg Netherlands, but it succeeds only in delaying the beginning of the Eighty Years' War in the Netherlands.

 July–December 
 August 6 – The siege of Szigetvár is begun by Suleiman the Magnificent, Sultan of the Ottoman Empire. This is the Ottoman Empire at its greatest extent.
 August 10 – Beeldenstorm: Calvinists engage in widespread destruction of religious art in the Low Countries. On August 25, the vandalism reaches Leiden.

 September 7 – Suleiman the Magnificent dies in his tent at the siege of Szigetvár, and Selim II succeeds him as Sultan of the Ottoman Empire.
 September 8 – The siege of Szigetvár ends in battle, with 2,300 Hungarian and Croatian defenders, including their general, Nikola Šubić Zrinski, annihilated by an army of 90,000 soldiers of the Ottoman Empire, under Sokollu Mehmed Pasha.

 Date unknown 
 The Spanish gold escudo, worth 16 silver reales, is first minted during the reign of Philip II of Spain.
 Pope Pius V expels most prostitutes from Rome, and the Papal States.
 Between July 19, 1566 and July 7, 1567 – The first bridge crossing the Neretva River at Mostar (in modern-day Bosnia and Herzegovina) is completed by the Ottoman Empire. The white marble bridge becomes known as Stari Most ("Old Bridge").

Births 

 January 13 – Maria of Brunswick-Lüneburg, Duchess Consort of Saxe-Lauenburg (1582–1619) (d. 1626)
 January 15 – Philipp Uffenbach, German artist (d. 1636)
 February 1 – Marie of the Incarnation, French Discalced Carmelite beatified nun and blessed (d. 1618)
 February 18 – Francesco Erizzo, Doge of Venice (d. 1646)
 March 1 – John Hoskins, English poet (d. 1638)
 March 8 – Carlo Gesualdo, Italian music composer (d. 1613)
 April 2 – Bartholda van Swieten, Dutch diplomat (d. 1647)
 May 26 – Mehmed III, Ottoman Sultan (d. 1603)
 June 19 – King James VI of Scotland/James I of England and Ireland (d. 1625)
 June 20 – King Sigismund III Vasa, of Poland and Sweden (d. 1632)
 July 9 – John Ernest, Duke of Saxe-Eisenach, German duke (d. 1638)
 August 12 – Infanta Isabella Clara Eugenia of Spain (d. 1633)
 August 24 – Abraham Scultetus, German theologian (d. 1625)
 September 1 – Edward Alleyn, English actor (d. 1626)
 October 13 – Richard Boyle, 1st Earl of Cork, Irish politician (d. 1643)
 October 15 – Sigrid of Sweden, Swedish princess (d. 1633)
 November 3 – Charles, Count of Soissons, French prince du sang and military commander (d. 1612)
 November 9 – Christian, Duke of Brunswick-Lüneburg, Prince of Lüneburt (1611–1633) (d. 1633)
 November 16 – Anna Juliana Gonzaga, Archduchess of Austria and nun (d. 1621)
 November 21 – Francesco Cennini de' Salamandri, Roman Catholic cardinal (d. 1645)
 November 25 – John Heminges, English actor (d. 1630)
 November 26 – Francesco Bracciolini, Italian poet (d. 1645)
 December 1 – Philip of Nassau, Count of Nassau (d. 1595)
 December 11 – (baptised) – Manuel Cardoso, Portuguese composer (d. 1650)
 December 19 – George Talbot, 9th Earl of Shrewsbury, English earl (d. 1630)
 December 27 – Jan Jesenius, Slovak physician (d. 1621)
 date unknown
 Pietro Cerone, Italian music theorist (d. 1625)
 Polyxena von Lobkowicz, politically active Czech aristocrat (d. 1642) 
 Giovanni Baglione, Italian painter and historian of art (d. 1643)
 Michal Sedziwój, Polish alchemist (d. 1636)
 James Sempill, Scottish theologian (d. 1626)
 Lucia Quinciani, Italian composer
 Caterina Vitale, Maltese pharmacist (d. 1619)

Deaths 

 January 6 – Francesco Gonzaga, Spanish Catholic cardinal (b. 1538)
 January 7 – Louis de Blois, Flemish mystical writer (b. 1506)
 February 3 – George Cassander, Flemish theologian (b. 1513)
 February 24 – Mimura Iechika, Japanese warlord (b. 1517)
 March 9 – David Rizzio, Italian secretary of Mary, Queen of Scots (b. 1533)
 March 23 – Wolfgang, Prince of Anhalt-Köthen, German prince (b. 1492)
 March 26 – Antonio de Cabezón, Spanish composer and organist (b. 1510)
 March 28 – Sigismund von Herberstein, Austrian diplomat (b. 1486)
 April 25 – Diane de Poitiers, mistress of King Henry II of France (b. 1499)
 April 25 – Louise Labé, French poet (b. c. 1524)
 May 10 – Leonhart Fuchs, German physician and a botanist (b. 1501)
 July 2 – Nostradamus, French astrologer (b. 1503)
 July 13 – Thomas Hoby, English diplomat and translator (b. 1530)
 July 18 – Bartolomé de las Casas, Spanish priest (b. 1484)
 July 30 – Guillaume Rondelet, French doctor (b. 1507)
 August 19 – Elisabeth of Brunswick-Calenberg, Countess of Henneberg (b. 1526)
 September 2 – Taddeo Zuccari, Italian painter (b. 1529)
 September 6 – Suleiman the Magnificent, Ottoman Sultan since 1520 (b. 1494)
 September 17 – Íñigo López de Mendoza, 4th Duke of the Infantado (b. 1493)
 September 22 – Johannes Agricola, German Protestant reformer (b. 1494)
 September 27 – Marco Girolamo Vida, Italian poet (b. 1490)
 October 13 – Zilia Dandolo, Venetian dogaressa
 October 28 – Johann Funck, German theologian (b. 1518)
 October 31 – Richard Edwardes, English poet (b. 1523)
 November 2 – Thomas White, English politician (b. 1507)
 November 17 – Annibale Caro, Italian poet and Knight of Malta (b. 1507)
 November 27 – Froben Christoph of Zimmern, author of the Zimmern Chronicle (b. 1519)
 December 1 – Francisco Mendoza de Bobadilla, Spanish Catholic cardinal (b. 1508)
 December 14 – René, Marquis of Elbeuf (b. 1536)
 December 26 – Kimotsuki Kanetsugu, Japanese samurai (b. 1511)
 December 28 – Margaret Paleologa, Sovereign Marchioness of Montferrat (1531–1540) (b. 1510)
 date unknown
 Charles Dumoulin, French jurist (b. 1500)
 Calvagh O'Donnell, Irish chieftain
probable - Jacob Acontius, Swiss jurist, theologian, philosopher and engineer (b. 1492)

References